Deliaesianum is a genus of beetles in the family Carabidae, containing the following species:

 Deliaesianum bengalense (Chaudoir, 1878)
 Deliaesianum damruz Morvan, 1999
 Deliaesianum deliae Morvan, 1999
 Deliaesianum kucerai Morvan, 2007
 Deliaesianum nepalensis Morvan, 1999
 Deliaesianum queinneci Deuve, 1986

References

Platyninae